Aramaic is a Semitic language.

Aramaic may also refer to: 
 Aramaic alphabet, adapted from the Phoenician alphabet and became distinctive from it by the 8th century BCE
 Aramaic studies, an academic discipline that studies Aramaic languages and cultural heritage

See also
 
 Aramean (disambiguation)
 Syriac (disambiguation)